Phobos 2 was the last space probe designed by the Soviet Union. It was designed to explore the moons of Mars, Phobos and Deimos. It was launched on 12 July 1988, and entered orbit on 29 January 1989.

Phobos 2 operated nominally throughout its cruise and Mars orbital insertion phases on 29 January 1989, gathering data on the Sun, interplanetary medium, Mars, and Phobos. Phobos 2 investigated Mars surface and atmosphere and returned 37 images of Phobos with a resolution of up to 40 meters.

Shortly before the final phase of the mission, during which the spacecraft was to approach within  of Phobos' surface and release two landers (One, a mobile , the other, a stationary platform) contact with Phobos 2 was lost. The mission ended when the spacecraft signal failed to be successfully reacquired on 27 March 1989. The cause of the failure was determined to be a malfunction of the on-board computer.

Background

The intent to carry out a mission with Phobos as the target was first made public 14 November 1984. Phobos was chosen as the target in order to avoid directly competing with previous American missions. Originally a 1986 launch was planned but this was later moved to 1988.

Mission profile

Phobos 2 started to develop problems during the interplanetary flight phase of the mission. By the time the probe reached Mars orbit, two of its three computers were not working properly. One of the computers was completely dead, and the second was starting to malfunction. Since the probe worked on a system of its computers voting on any decision, the one healthy computer would not be able to control the craft because it would be unable to outvote two dead computers. The craft's high speed transmitter had also developed issues.

Phobos 2 successfully carried out three preliminary encounters with Phobos during which time it was imaged with the Videospectrometric Camera, the Combined Radiometer and Photometer for Mars and the Imaging Spectrometer for Mars.

Spacecraft design

Instruments

These observations made it possible to retrieve the first mineralogical maps of the planet and its satellite, and to study the atmosphere of Mars. ISM was developed at IAS and DESPA (Paris Observatory) with support from CNES.

List of instruments:
 "VSK" TV imaging system
 PROP-F "hopping" lander.
ARS-FP automatic X-ray fluorescence spectrometer
ferroprobe magnetometer
Kappameter magnetic permeability / susceptibility sensor
gravimeter
temperature sensors
BISIN conductometer / tiltmeter
mechanical sensors (penetrometer, UIU accelerometer, sensors on hopping mechanism)
"DAS" (long-lived autonomous station) lander
TV camera
ALPHA-X Alpha-Proton-X-Ray Spectrometer
LIBRATION sun sensor (also known as STENOPEE)
Seismometer
RAZREZ anchor penetrometer
Celestial mechanics experiment
 "ISM" thermal infrared spectrometer/radiometer -  resolution
 near-infrared imaging spectrometer
 thermal imaging camera; magnetometers
 gamma-ray spectrometers
 X-ray telescope
 radiation detectors
 radar and laser altimeters
 Lima-D laser experiment - designed to vaporize material from the Phobos surface for chemical analysis by a mass spectrometer
 Automatic Space Plasma Experiment with Rotating Analyzer (ASPERA), an electron spectrometer and ion mass analyser from the Swedish Institute of Space Physics.

Results
The craft took 37 photos of Phobos imaging the majority (80%) of the moon. The infrared spectrometer found no sign of water.

Legacy
The Phobos design was used again for the long delayed Mars 96 mission which ended in failure when the launch vehicle's fourth stage misfired. In addition, the Fobos-Grunt mission, also designed to explore Phobos, ended in failure in 2011. Thus far, there has not been a completely successful probe to Phobos.

References

External links
 High quality processed images from the Phobos 2 mission
 Phobos mission images from the Space Research Institute (IKI)
 Raw image data from the Phobos 2 ISM infrared instrument
 What we are searching for on Phobos - an article on the Phobos program at the Web site of the Russian Space Agency 
 Another site with processed images from the Soviet Phobos 2 mission

Missions to Mars
1988 in the Soviet Union
Soviet Mars missions
Derelict space probes
Phobos (moon)
Derelict satellites orbiting Mars
Non Earth orbiting satellites of the Soviet Union
Spacecraft launched in 1988